A town is a human settlement. Towns are generally larger than villages and smaller than cities, though the criteria to distinguish between them vary considerably in different parts of the world.

Origin and use 
The word "town" shares an origin with the German word , the Dutch word , and the Old Norse . The original Proto-Germanic word, *tūnan, is thought to be an early borrowing from Proto-Celtic *dūnom (cf. Old Irish , Welsh ).

The original sense of the word in both Germanic and Celtic was that of a fortress or an enclosure. Cognates of town in many modern Germanic languages designate a fence or a hedge. In English and Dutch, the meaning of the word took on the sense of the space which these fences enclosed, and through which a track must run. In England, a town was a small community that could not afford or was not allowed to build walls or other larger fortifications, and built a palisade or stockade instead. In the Netherlands, this space was a garden, more specifically those of the wealthy, which had a high fence or a wall around them (like the garden of the palace of Het Loo in Apeldoorn, which was the model for the privy garden of William III and Mary II at Hampton Court). In Old Norse  means a (grassy) place between farmhouses, and the word is still used with a similar meaning in modern Norwegian.

Old English  became a common place-name suffix in England and southeastern Scotland during the Anglo-Saxon settlement period. In Old English and Early and Middle Scots, the words ton, toun, etc. could refer to diverse kinds of settlements from agricultural estates and holdings, partly picking up the Norse sense (as in the Scots word ) at one end of the scale, to fortified municipalities. Other common Anglo-Saxon suffixes included ham 'home', stede 'stead', and burh 'bury, borough, burgh'.

In some cases, town is an alternative name for "city" or "village" (especially a larger village). Sometimes, the word town is short for township. In general, today towns can be differentiated from townships, villages, or hamlets on the basis of their economic character, in that most of a town's population will tend to derive their living from manufacturing industry, commerce, and public services rather than primary sector industries such as agriculture or related activities.

A place's population size is not a reliable determinant of urban character. In many areas of the world, e.g. in India at least until recent times, a large village might contain several times as many people as a small town. In the United Kingdom, there are historical cities that are far smaller than the larger towns.

The modern phenomenon of extensive suburban growth, satellite urban development, and migration of city dwellers to villages has further complicated the definition of towns, creating communities urban in their economic and cultural characteristics but lacking other characteristics of urban localities.

Some forms of non-rural settlement, such as temporary mining locations, may be clearly non-rural, but have at best a questionable claim to be called a town.

Towns often exist as distinct governmental units, with legally defined borders and some or all of the appurtenances of local government (e.g. a police force). In the United States these are referred to as "incorporated towns". In other cases the town lacks its own governance and is said to be "unincorporated". Note that the existence of an unincorporated town may be legally set out by other means, e.g. zoning districts. In the case of some planned communities, the town exists legally in the form of covenants on the properties within the town. The United States Census identifies many census-designated places (CDPs) by the names of unincorporated towns which lie within them; however, those CDPs typically include rural and suburban areas and even surrounding villages and other towns.

The distinction between a town and a city similarly depends on the approach: a city may strictly be an administrative entity which has been granted that designation by law, but in informal usage, the term is also used to denote an urban locality of a particular size or importance: whereas a medieval city may have possessed as few as 10,000 inhabitants, today some consider an urban place of fewer than 100,000 as a town, even though there are many officially designated cities that are much smaller than that.

In toponymic terminology, names of individual towns and cities are called astyonyms or astionyms (from Ancient Greek  'town, city', and  'name').

History
Through different periods of recorded history, many towns have grown into sizeable settlements, with the development of properties, centres of culture, and specialized economies.

Neolithic
Çatalhöyük, currently an archaeological site, was considered to be the oldest inhabited town that existed from around 7500 BC. Inscribed as a World Heritage Site, it remains a depopulated town with a complex of ruins.

Roman era

In Roman times, a villa was a rural settlement formed by a main residential building and another series of secondary buildings. It constituted the center from which an agricultural holding was administered. Subsequently, it lost its agricultural functions and reduced its activity to residential. With the consolidation of large estates during the Roman Empire, the town became the center of large farms.

A distinction was created between rustic and urban settlements:
Rustic villas, from where the exploitation of resources was directed, slave workers resided, livestock were kept and production was stored.
Urban villas, in which the lord resided and which increasingly adopted the architectural and beautification forms typical of urban mansions. When from the first century the great territorial property was divided between the area directly exploited by the lord and that ceded to tenant settlers, urban villas became the centers of the administrative power of the lords, appearing the forms of vassalage typical of feudalism of the fourth century.

Terminology for statistics

193 countries have been involved in a common effort to agree on a common statistical definition of the three categories: cities, towns and rural areas.

Age of towns scheme 
Australian geographer Thomas Griffith Taylor proposed a classification of towns based on their age and pattern of land use. He identified five types of town:
 Infantile towns, with no clear zoning
 Juvenile towns, which have developed an area of shops
 Adolescent towns, where factories have started to appear
 Early mature towns, with a separate area of high-class housing
 Mature towns, with defined industrial, commercial and various types of residential area

By country

Afghanistan 
In Afghanistan, towns and cities are known as shār (Dari: شهر, Pashto: ښار). As the country is an historically rural society with few larger settlements, with major cities never holding more than a few hundred thousand inhabitants before the 2000s, the lingual tradition of the country does not discriminate between towns and cities.

Albania and Kosovo 
In Albania and Kosovo  means 'town', which is very similar to the word for city, although there is no official use of the term for any settlement.
In Albanian  means 'small city' or 'new city', while in ancient times it referred to a small residential center within the walls of a castle.

Australia 
In Australia, most rural and regional centres of population can be called towns; many small towns have populations of less than 200. The smallest may be described as townships.

In addition, some local government entities are officially styled as towns in Queensland, South Australia, Western Australia and the Northern Territory, and formerly also (till the 1990s) in Victoria.

Austria 

The Austrian legal system does not distinguish between villages, towns, and cities. The country is partitioned into 2098 municipalities of fundamentally equal rank. Larger municipalities are designated as market towns or cities, but these distinctions are purely symbolic and do not confer additional legal responsibilities. There is a number of smaller communities that are labelled cities because they used to be regional population centers in the distant past. The city of Rattenberg for example has about 400 inhabitants. The city of Hardegg has about 1200 inhabitants.

There are no unincorporated areas.

Of the 201 cities in Austria, 15 are statutory cities. A statutory city is a city that is vested, in addition to its purview as a municipality, with the duties of a district administrative authority. The status does not come with any additional autonomy: district administrative authorities are essentially just service centers that citizens use to interact with the national government, for example to apply for driver licenses or passports. The national government generally uses the provinces to run these points of contact on its behalf; in the case of statutory cities, the municipality gets to step up.

Brazil 
In Brazil, since 1938, it was defined that the seat of the municipalities would pass to the category of city and give it the name and the districts would be designated by the name of their respective seats, and if they were not municipal seats, they would have the category of village.

Bulgaria 

Bulgarians do not, in general, differentiate between 'city' and 'town'. However, in everyday language and media the terms "large towns" and "small towns" are in use. "Large towns" usually refers to Sofia, Plovdiv, Varna and Burgas, which have population over 200,000. Ruse and Stara Zagora are often included as well due to presence of relatively developed infrastructure and population over 100,000 threshold. It is difficult to call the remaining provincial capitals "large towns" as, in general, they are less developed and have shrinking population, some with as few as 30,000 inhabitants.

In Bulgaria the Council of Ministers defines what constitutes a settlement, while the President of Bulgaria grants each settlement its title. In 2005 the requirement that villages that wish to classify themselves as town must have a social and technical infrastructure, as well as a population of no fewer than 3500 people. For resort settlements the requirements are lower with the population needing to be no fewer than 1000 people but infrastructure requirements remain.

Canada 

The legal definition of a town in Canada varies by province or territory, as each has jurisdiction over defining and legislating towns, cities and other types of municipal organization within its own boundaries.

The province of Quebec is unique in that it makes no distinction under law between towns and cities. While an informal preference may exist among English speakers as to whether any individual  is commonly referred to as a city or as a town, no distinction and no objective legal criteria exist to make such a distinction under law.

Chile 
In Chile, towns are defined by the National Statistics Institute (INE) as an urban entity with a population from 2001 to 5000 or an area with a population from 1001 to 2000 and an established economic activity.

Czech Republic

In the Czech Republic, a municipality can obtain the title of a city, town or market town. The title is granted by law.

Statutory cities (in English usually called just "cities"), which are defined by law no. 128/2000 Coll., can define their own self-governing municipal districts. There are 26 such cities, in addition to Prague, which is a de facto statutory city. All the Czech municipalities with more than 40,000 inhabitants are cities.

Town and market town are above all ceremonious honorary degrees, referring to population, history and regional significance of a municipality. As the statistics of Czech municipalities shows, towns usually have between 1,000 and 35,000 inhabitants, with median around 4,000 and average around 6,500. Nowadays a municipality must have at least 3,000 inhabitants to have the right to request the town title. Market towns usually have between 500 and 4,000 inhabitants, with median and average both around 1,000.

Denmark 
For formal purposes, urban areas having at least 200 inhabitants are considered .

Historically some towns held various privileges, the most important of which was the right to hold market. They were administered separately from the rural areas in both fiscal, military and legal matters.

Estonia
In Estonia, there is no distinction between a town and a city as the word  is used for both bigger and smaller settlements, which are bigger than villages and boroughs. There are 30 municipal towns in Estonia and a further 17 towns, which have merged with a municipal parish.

Finland

In Finland, there is no distinction between a town and a city as the word  is used for both bigger and smaller settlements, which are bigger than villages and boroughs; although when talking about the word town, the word  is used ( means 'little' or 'small'). There are over one hundred municipal towns in Finland.

France 

From an administrative standpoint, the smallest level of local authorities are all called communes. They can have anywhere from a handful to millions of inhabitants, and France has 36,000 of them. The French term for town is bourg but French laws generally do not distinguish between towns and cities which are all commonly called . However, some laws do treat these authorities differently based on the population and different rules apply to the three big cities Paris, Lyon and Marseille. For historical reasons, six communes in the Meuse département exist as independent administrative entities despite having no inhabitants at all.

For statistical purposes, the national statistical institute (INSEE) operates a distinction between urban areas with fewer than 2,000 inhabitants and bigger communes, the latter being called . Smaller settlements are usually called .

Germany 

Germans do not, in general, differentiate between 'city' and 'town'. The term  may be translated as 'city'.

Designations in different states are as diverse as e.g. in Australian States and Territories, and differ from state to state. Historically those had  (market right) but not full town privileges; see Market town. The legal denomination of a specific settlement may differ from its common designation (e.g.  – a legal term in Lower Saxony for a group of villages [, pl. ] with common local government created by combining municipalities [, pl. ]).

Greece and Cyprus 
Careful speakers may also use the word  to refer to towns with a population of 2,000–9,999.
A sweeping reform, carried out in two stages early in the 21st century, merged most  with the nearest , dividing the whole country into 325 self-governing . The former municipalities survive as administrative subdivisions.

Cyprus, including the Turkish-occupied areas, is also divided into 39  (in principle, with at least 5,000 inhabitants, though there are exceptions) and 576 .

Hong Kong 

Hong Kong started developing new towns in the 1950s, to accommodate exponential population increase. The first new towns included Tsuen Wan and Kwun Tong. In the late 1960s and the 1970s, another stage of new town developments was launched. Nine new towns have been developed so far. Land use is carefully planned and development provides plenty of room for public housing projects. Rail transport is usually available at a later stage. The first towns are Sha Tin, Tsuen Wan, Tuen Mun and Tseung Kwan O. Tuen Mun was intended to be self-reliant, but was not successful and turned into a bedroom community like the other new towns. More recent developments are Tin Shui Wai and North Lantau (Tung Chung-Tai Ho).

Hungary 
In Hungary there is no official distinction between a city and a town (the word for both in Hungarian is ). Every year the Minister of Internal Affairs selects candidates from a committee-screened list of applicants, whom the President of Republic usually affirms by issuing a bill of town's rank to them.

Before the fall of communism in 1990, Hungarian villages with fewer than 10,000 residents were not allowed to become towns. Recently some settlements as small as 2,500 souls have received the rank of town (e.g. Visegrád, Zalakaros or Gönc) and meeting the conditions of development is often disregarded to quickly elevate larger villages into towns. As of middle 2013, there are 346 towns in Hungary, encompassing some 69% of the entire population.

(There are a few exceptions, when towns of fewer than 50,000 people gained the status: Érd, Hódmezővásárhely, Salgótarján and Szekszárd) As of middle 2013, there are only 23 such towns in Hungary.

Iceland

India 

The 2011 Census of India defines towns of two types: statutory town and census town. Statutory town is defined as all places with a municipality, corporation, cantonment board or notified town area committee. Census towns are defined as places that satisfy the following criteria:
 Minimum population of 5,000
 At least 75% of male working population engaged in non-agricultural pursuits
 Density of population at least 400/km2. (1,000 per sq. mile).

All the statutory towns, census towns and out growths are considered as urban settlements, as opposed to rural areas.

Towns in India usually have basic infrastructure like shops, electricity, bituminised roads, post offices, banks, telephone facilities, high schools and sometimes a few government offices. The human population living in these towns may be a few thousand. There are some towns which can be labelled as Main road town.

Iran 
In older Persian texts (until the first half of the 20th century), the Arabic word  was used for a town. However, in the past 50 years, this word has become obsolete.

There is a word in Persian which is used for special sort of satellite townships and city neighborhoods.
Another smaller type of town or neighborhood in a big city is called .  and  each have different legal definitions.

The pace in which different large villages have gained city status in Iran shows a dramatic increase in the last two decades.

Iraq 
The word  is used to describe villages, the word  to describe towns, and the word  to describe cities.

Ireland 

The Local Government act 2001 provides that from January 1, 2002 (section 10 subsection (3)):

These provisions affect the replacement of the boroughs, towns and urban districts which existed before then. Similar reforms in the nomenclature of local authorities (but not their functions) are affected by section 11 part 17 of the act includes provision (section 185(2))

and contains provisions enabling the establishment of new town councils and provisions enabling the dissolution of existing or new town councils in certain circumstances

The reference to "town having a population of at least 7,500 as ascertained at the last preceding census" hands much of the power relating to defining what is in fact a town over to the Central Statistics Office and their criteria are published as part of each census.

Planning and Development Act 2000
Another reference to the Census and its role in determining what is or is not a town for some administrative purpose is in the Planning and Development act 2000 (part II chapter I which provides for Local area plans):

Central Statistics Office criteria
These are set out in full at 2006 Census Appendices.

In short they speak of "towns with legally defined boundaries" (i.e. those established by the Local Government Act 2001) and the remaining 664 as "census towns", defined by themselves since 1971 as "a cluster of 50 or more occupied dwellings in which within a distance of 800 meters there is a nucleus of 30 occupied houses on both sides of the road or twenty occupied houses on one side of the road". There is also a "200 meter criterion" for determining whether a house is part of a census town.

Isle of Man
There are four settlements which are historically and officially designated as towns (Douglas, Ramsey, Peel, Castletown); however
 Peel is also sometimes referred to as a city by virtue of its cathedral.
 Onchan and Port Erin are both larger in population than the smallest "town", having expanded in modern times, but are designated as villages.

Israel 
However, the term  is normally used only to describe towns in foreign countries, i.e. urban areas of limited population, particularly when the speaker is attempting to evoke nostalgic or romantic attitudes. The term is also used to describe a Shtetl, a pre-Holocaust Eastern European Jewish town.

Within Israel, established urban areas are always referred to as cities (with one notable exception explained below) regardless of their actual size. Israeli law does not define any nomenclature for distinction between urban areas based on size or any other factor – meaning that all urban settlements in Israel are legally referred to as "cities".

The exception to the above is the term  (lit. 'Development Town') which is applied to certain cities in Israel based on the reasons for their establishment. These cities, created during the earlier decades of Israeli independence (1950s and 1960s, generally), were designed primarily to serve as commercial and transportation hubs, connecting smaller agricultural settlements in the northern and southern regions of the country (the "Periphery") to the major urban areas of the coastal and central regions. Some of these development towns have since grown to a comparatively large size, and yet are still referred to as development towns, particularly when the speaker wishes to emphasize their (often low) socio-economic status. Nonetheless, they are rarely (if ever) referred to simply as towns; when referring to one directly, it will be called either a development town or a city, depending on context.

Italy 

Although Italian provides different words for city, town and village (old-fashioned, or frazione, most common), no legal definitions exist as to how settlements must be classified. Administratively, both towns and cities are ruled as comuni/comunes, while villages might be subdivisions of the former.
Generally, in everyday speech, a town is larger or more populated than a village and smaller than a city. Various cities and towns together may form a metropolitan area. A city, can also be a culturally, economically or politically prominent community with respect to surrounding towns. Moreover, a city can be such by Presidential decree. A town, in contrast, can be an inhabited place which would elsewhere be styled a city, but has not received any official recognition.
Also, the Italian word for 'town' ( with lowercase P) must not be confused with the Italian word for 'country/nation' ( usually with uppercase P).

Japan 
In Japan city status (市 shi) was traditionally reserved for only a few particularly large settlements. Over time however the necessary conditions to be a city have been watered down and today the only loose rules that apply are having a population over 50,000 and over 60% of the population in a "city centre". In recent times many small villages and towns have merged in order to form a city despite seeming geographically to be just a collection of villages.

The distinction between towns (町 machi/chō) and villages (村 mura/son) is largely unwritten and purely one of population size when the settlement was founded with villages having under 10,000 and towns 10,000–50,000.

Korea 

In both of South Korea and North Korea, towns are called eup.

Latvia 

In Latvia, towns and cities are indiscriminately called  in singular form. However, a city can be called  in reference to its size.

Lithuania 

In Lithuanian, a city is called miestas and a town is called miestelis (literally 'small '). Metropolises are called didmiestis (literally 'big ').

Malaysia 
In Malaysia, a town is the area administered by a municipal council.

Netherlands 
About 220 places were granted  ('city rights') and are still so called for historical and traditional reasons, though the word is also used for large urban areas that never obtained such rights. A hamlet usually has fewer than 1,000 inhabitants, a village ranges from 1,000 up to 25,000 inhabitants, and a place above 25,000 can call itself either village or city, mostly depending on historic reasons or size of the place. As an example, The Hague never gained city rights, but because of its size – more than half a million inhabitants – it is regarded as a city. Staverden, with only 40 inhabitants, would be a hamlet, but because of its city rights it may call itself a city.

For statistical purposes, the Netherlands has three sorts of cities:
  (small city): 50,000–99,999 inhabitants
  (medium-sized city): 100,000–249,999 inhabitants
  (large city): 250,000 or more

New Zealand 
In New Zealand, a town is a built-up area that is not large enough to be considered a city. Historically, this definition corresponded to a population of between approximately 1,000 and 20,000. Towns have no independent legal existence, being administered simply as built-up parts of districts, or, in some cases, of cities.

New Zealand's towns vary greatly in size and importance, ranging from small rural service centres to significant regional centres such as Blenheim and Taupō. Typically, once a town reaches a population of somewhere between 20,000 and 30,000 people, it will begin to be informally regarded as a city. One who regards a settlement as too small to be a town will typically call it a "township" or "village."

Norway 
They are all part of and administered as a kommune ('municipality').

Norway has had inland the northernmost city in the world: Hammerfest. Now the record is held by New Ålesund on the Norwegian island Svalbard.

Philippines 

In the Philippines, the local official equivalent of the town is the municipality. Every municipality, or town, in the country has a mayor and a vice mayor as well as local town officials (Sangguniang Bayan). Philippine towns, otherwise called municipalities, are composed of a number of villages and communities called barangays with one (or a few cluster of) (s) serving as the town center or poblacion.

Respectively, examples of these are the town of B. E. Dujali in Davao del Norte province, which was formed in 1998 from a cluster of five , and the city of El Salvador, which was converted from a town to a city in 2007. Each town in the Philippines was classified by its annual income and budget.

A sharp, hierarchical distinction exists between Philippine cities ( or ) and towns, as towns in the country are juridically separate from cities, which are typically larger and more populous (some smaller and less populated) and which political and economic status are above those of towns. This was further supported and indicated by the income classification system implemented by the National Department of Finance, to which both cities and towns fell into their respective categories that indicate they are such as stated under Philippine law. However despite this some towns in the Philippines are significantly larger than some cities in the Philippines such as Rodriguez, Rizal, Santa Maria, Bulacan and Minglanilla, Cebu are actually bigger than some regional centers.

Poland 

As of 30 April 2022, there are altogether 2477 municipalities (gmina) in Poland, including 1513 rural gminas, while the remaining 968 ones contain cities and towns. Among them, 666 towns are part of an urban-rural gmina while 302 cities and towns are standalone as an urban gmina. The latter group includes 107 cities (governed by a prezydent miasta), including 66 cities with powiat rights. 37 cities among the latter group are over 100,000, including 18 cities serving as a seat for voivode or voivodeship sejmik, informally called voivodeship cities. 

In the Polish language there is no linguistic distinction between a city and a town. Town status is conferred by government legislation; new towns are designated by the government in an annual regulation effective from the first day of the year. Such localities have usually a town mayor as the head of the town executive. Towns may be called , a diminutive colloquially used for localities with a few thousand residents. Some settlements tend to remain villages even though they have a larger population than many smaller towns, primarily in order not to lose eligibility for the European Agricultural Fund for Rural Development.

Cities are the biggest municipalities. In the Polish language, there is no linguistic distinction between a city and a town, both translated . A city is, however, distinguished through being managed by a city mayor (literally translated city president) instead of a town mayor as the head of the city executive, thus being informally called miasto prezydenckie, with such privilege automatically awarded to municipalities either inhabited by more than 100,000 residents (currently 37) or those enjoying the status of a city with powiat rights (currently 66). As of 2022, all of the former group fit into the latter, though it was not always the case in the past. There is, however, a number of exemptions due to historic or political reasons, when a municipality meets neither of these two conditions but nevertheless has the city status, including the only 3 capitals of the former voivodeships of Poland (1975–1998) not meeting the abovementioned criteria, as well as further 38 municipalities which do not fit into any of the mentioned categories but have nevertheless been allowed to keep the earlier awarded status due to unspecified historical reasons.

Portugal 
Like other Iberian cultures, in Portugal there is a traditional distinction between towns and cities. Similarly, although these areas are not defined under the constitution, and have no political function (with associated organs), they are defined by law, and a town must have:
 at least 3,000 voters
 at least half of these services: health unit, pharmacy, cultural centre, public transportation network, post office, commercial food and drinking establishments, primary school and/or bank office

In this context, the town or city is subordinate to the local authority (civil parish or municipality, in comparison to the North American context, where they have political functions. In special cases, some villages may be granted the status of town if they possess historical, cultural or architectonic importance.

Portuguese urban settlements' heraldry reflects the difference between towns and cities, with the coat of arms of a town bearing a crown with four towers, while the coat of arms of a city bears a crown with five towers. This difference between towns and cities is still in use in other Portuguese-speaking countries, but in Brazil is no longer in use.

Romania 

In Romania there is no official distinction between a city and a town (the word for both in Romanian is ). Some settlements remain villages even though they have a larger population than other smaller towns.

Russia 

Occasionally the term  is applied to urban-type settlements as well, even though the status of those is not the same as that of a city/town proper.

In Russia, the criteria an inhabited locality needs to meet in order to be granted city/town status vary in different federal subjects. In general, to qualify for this status, an inhabited locality should have more than 12,000 inhabitants and the occupation of no less than 85% of inhabitants must be other than agriculture. However, inhabited localities which were previously granted the city/town status but no longer meet the criteria can still retain the status for historical reasons.

Singapore

In Singapore, towns are large scale satellite housing developments which are designed to be self-contained. It includes public housing units, a town centre and other amenities. Helmed by a hierarchy of commercial developments, ranging from a town centre to precinct-level outlets, there is no need to venture out of town to meet the most common needs of residences. Employment can be found in industrial estates located within several towns. Educational, health care, and recreational needs are also taken care of with the provision of schools, hospitals, parks, sports complexes, and so on. The most populous town in the country is Bedok.

South Africa
In South Africa the Afrikaans term  is used interchangeably with the English equivalent town. A town is a settlement that has a size that is smaller than that of a city.

Spain 
In Spain, the equivalent of town would be , a population unit between a village and a city, and is not defined by the number of inhabitants, but by some historical rights and privileges dating from the Middle Ages, such as the right to hold a market or fair.

Sweden 

The term  is used for an urban area or a locality, which however is a statistical rather than an administrative concept and encompasses densely settled villages with only 200 inhabitants as well as the major cities. The word köping corresponds to an English market town (chipping) or German Markt but is mainly of historical significance, as the term is not used today and only survives in some toponyms. Linköping.

Before 1971, 132 larger municipalities in Sweden enjoyed special royal charters as stad instead of kommun (which is similar to a US county).

'major cities', while Uppsala, with a population of approximately 230,000 in the municipality, which covers an unusually large area, almost three times larger than the combined land area of the municipalities of Stockholm, Göteborg and Malmö, is not. The largest contiguous urban area within Uppsala municipality has a population of well below 200,000, while the population of both Malmö municipality, with a land area only 1/14 the size of Uppsala municipality, and Malmö , i.e. contiguous urban area, is well over 300,000, and the population of the Malmö Metropolitan Area, with a land area only slightly larger than Uppsala Municipality, is well over 700,000.

Ukraine 

In Ukraine the term town existed from the Medieval period until 1925, when it was replaced by the Soviet government with urban type settlement. Historically, a town in the Ukrainian lands was a smaller populated place that was chartered under the German town law and had a market square (see Market town).

United Kingdom

England and Wales 

In England and Wales, a town traditionally was a settlement which had a charter to hold a market or fair and therefore became a "market town". Market towns were distinguished from villages in that they were the economic hub of a surrounding area, and were usually larger and had more facilities.

In parallel with popular usage, however, there are many technical and official definitions of what constitutes a town, to which various interested parties cling.

In modern official usage the term town is employed either for old market towns, or for settlements which have a town council, or for settlements which elsewhere would be classed a city, but which do not have the legal right to call themselves such. Any parish council can decide to describe itself as a town council, but this will usually only apply to the smallest "towns" (because larger towns will be larger than a single civil parish).

Not all settlements which are commonly described as towns have a town council or borough council. In fact, because of many successive changes to the structure of local government, there are now few large towns which are represented by a body closely related to their historic borough council. These days, a smaller town will usually be part of a local authority which covers several towns. And where a larger town is the seat of a local authority, the authority will usually cover a much wider area than the town itself (either a large rural hinterland, or several other, smaller towns).

Additionally, there are "new towns" which were created during the 20th century, such as Basildon, Redditch and Telford.

Some settlements which describe themselves as towns (e.g. Shipston-on-Stour, Warwickshire) are smaller than some large villages (e.g. Kidlington, Oxfordshire).

The status of a city is reserved for places that have letters patent entitling them to the name, historically associated with the possession of a cathedral. Some large municipalities (such as Northampton and Bournemouth) are legally boroughs but not cities, whereas some cities are quite small — such as Ely or St David's. The city of Brighton and Hove was created from the two former towns and some surrounding villages, and within the city the correct term for the former distinct entities is somewhat unclear.

It appears that a city may become a town, though perhaps only through administrative error: Rochester in Kent had been a city for centuries but, when in 1998 the Medway district was created, a bureaucratic blunder meant that Rochester lost its official city status and is now technically a town.

It is often thought that towns with bishops' seats rank automatically as cities: however, Chelmsford was a town until 5 June 2012 despite being the seat of the diocese of Chelmsford, created in 1914. St Asaph, which is the seat of the diocese of St Asaph, only became a city on 1 June 2012 though the diocese was founded in the mid-sixth century. In reality, the pre-qualification of having a cathedral of the established Church of England, and the formerly established Church in Wales or Church of Ireland, ceased to apply from 1888.

The word town can also be used as a general term for urban areas, including cities and in a few cases, districts within cities. In this usage, a city is a type of town; a large one, with a certain status. For example, central Greater London is sometimes referred to colloquially as "London town". (The "City of London" is the historical nucleus, informally known as the "Square Mile", and is administratively separate from the rest of Greater London, while the City of Westminster is also technically a city and is also a London borough.) Camden Town and Somers Town are districts of London, as New Town is a district of Edinburgh – actually the Georgian centre.

In recent years the division between cities and towns has grown, leading to the establishment of groups like the Centre for Towns, who work to highlight the issues facing many towns. Towns also became a significant issue in the 2020 Labour Party leadership election, with Lisa Nandy making significant reference to Labour needing to win back smaller towns which have swung away from the party.

Scotland 

In Scotland the word town has no specific legal meaning and (especially in areas which were or are still Gaelic-speaking) can refer to a mere collection of buildings (e.g. a farm-town or in Scots ), not all of which might be inhabited, or to an inhabited area of any size which is not otherwise described in terms such as city, burgh, etc. Many locations of greatly different size will be encountered with a name ending with -town, -ton, -toun etc. (or beginning with the Gaelic equivalent  etc.).

"Burgh" (pronounced burruh) is the Scots term for a town or a municipality. They were highly autonomous units of local government from at least the 12th century until their abolition in 1975, when a new regional structure of local government was introduced across the country. Usually based upon a town, they had a municipal corporation and certain rights, such as a degree of self-governance and representation in the sovereign Parliament of Scotland adjourned in 1707.

The term no longer describes units of local government, although various claims are made from time to time that the legislation used was not competent to change the status of the Royal Burghs described below. The status is now chiefly ceremonial but various functions have been inherited by current councils (e.g. the application of various endowments providing for public benefit) which might only apply within the area previously served by a burgh; in consequence a burgh can still exist (if only as a defined geographical area) and might still be signed as such by the current local authority. The word 'burgh' is generally not used as a synonym for 'town' or 'city' in everyday speech, but is reserved mostly for government and administrative purposes.

Historically, the most important burghs were royal burghs, followed by burghs of regality and burghs of barony. Some newer settlements were only designated as police burghs from the 19th century onward, a classification which also applies to most of the older burghs.

United States 

The definition of town varies widely from state to state, and in many states there is no official definition. In some states, the term town refers to an area of population distinct from others in some meaningful dimension, typically population or type of government. The characteristic that distinguishes a town from another type of populated place — a city, borough, village, or township, for example — differs from state to state. In some states, a town is an incorporated municipality; that is, one with a charter received from the state, similar to a city (see incorporated town), while in others, a town is unincorporated. In some instances, the term town refers to a small incorporated municipality of less than a population threshold specified by state statute, while in others a town can be significantly larger. Some states do not use the term town at all, while in others the term has no official meaning and is used informally to refer to a populated place, of any size, whether incorporated or unincorporated. In some other states, the words town and city are legally interchangeable.

Small-town life has been a major theme in American literature, especially stories of rejection by young people leaving for the metropolis.

Since the use of the term varies considerably by state, individual usages are presented in the following sections:

Alabama
In Alabama, the legal use of the terms town and city is based on population.  A municipality with a population of 2,000 or more is a city, while less than 2,000 is a town (Code of Alabama 1975, Section 11-40-6).  For legislative purposes, municipalities are divided into eight classes based on population.  Class 8 includes all towns, plus cities with populations of less than 6,000 (Code of Alabama 1975, Section 11-40-12).

Arizona

In Arizona, the terms town and city are largely interchangeable. A community may incorporate under either a town or a city organization with no regard to population or other restrictions according to Arizona law (see Arizona Revised Statutes, Title 9). Cities may function under slightly differing governmental systems, such as the option to organize a district system for city governments, but largely retain the same powers as towns. Arizona law also allows for the consolidation of neighboring towns and the unification of a city and a town, but makes no provision for the joining of two adjacent cities.

California
In California, the words town and city are synonymous by law (see Cal. Govt. Code Secs. 34500–34504). There are two types of cities in California: charter and general law. Cities organized as charter cities derive their authority from a charter that they draft and file with the state, and which, among other things, states the municipality's name as "City of (Name)" or "Town of (Name)." Government Code Sections 34500–34504 applies to cities organized as general law cities, which differ from charter cities in that they do not have charters but instead operate with the powers conferred them by the pertinent sections of the Government Code. Like charter cities, general law cities may incorporate as "City of (Name)" or "Town of (Name)."

Some cities change what they are referred to as. The sign in front of the municipal offices in Los Gatos, California, for example, reads "City of Los Gatos", but the words engraved on the building above the front entrance when the city hall was built read "Town of Los Gatos." There are also signs at the municipal corporation limit, some of which welcome visitors to the "City of Los Gatos" while older, adjacent signs welcome people to the "Town of Los Gatos." Meanwhile, the village does not exist in California as a municipal corporation. Instead, the word town is commonly used to indicate any unincorporated community that might otherwise be known as an unincorporated village. Additionally, some people may still use the word town as shorthand for township, which is not an incorporated municipality but an administrative division of a county.

Hawaii

The Hawaiian Island of Oahu has various communities that may be referred to as towns. However, the entire island is lumped as a single incorporated city, the City and County of Honolulu. The towns on Oahu are merely unincorporated census-designated places.

Illinois
In Illinois, the word town has been used both to denote a subdivision of a county called a township, and to denote a form of municipality similar to a village, in that it is generally governed by a president and trustees rather than a mayor. In some areas a town may be incorporated legally as a village (meaning it has at large trustees) or a city (meaning it has aldermen from districts) and absorb the duties of the township it is coterminous with (maintenance of birth records, certain welfare items). Evanston, Berwyn and Cicero are examples of towns in this manner. Under the current Illinois Municipal Code, an incorporated or unincorporated town may choose to incorporate as a city or as a village, but other forms of incorporation are no longer allowed.

Louisiana
In Louisiana, a town is defined as being a municipal government having a population of 1,001 to 4,999 inhabitants.

Maryland

While a town is generally considered a smaller entity than a city, the two terms are legally interchangeable in Maryland.  The only exception is the independent city of Baltimore, which is a special case, as it was created by the Constitution of Maryland.

Nevada

In Nevada, a town has a form of government, but is not considered to be incorporated. It generally provides a limited range of services, such as land use planning and recreation, while leaving most services to the county. Many communities have found this "semi-incorporated" status attractive; the state has only 20 incorporated cities, and towns as large as Paradise (186,020 in 2000 Census), home of the Las Vegas Strip. Most county seats are also towns, not cities.

New England

In the six New England states, a town is the most prevalent minor civil division, and in most cases, are a more important form of government than the county. In Connecticut, Rhode Island and seven out of fourteen counties in Massachusetts, in fact, counties only exist as boundaries for state services and chambers of commerce at most, and have no independent legal functions. In New Hampshire, Maine, and Vermont, counties function at a limited scope, and are still not as important in northern New England as they are outside of the northeast. In all six states, towns perform functions that in most states would be county functions. The defining feature of a New England town, as opposed to a city, is that a town meeting and a board of selectmen serve as the main form of government for a town, while cities are run by a mayor and a city council.  For example, Brookline, Massachusetts is a town, even though it is fairly urban, because of its form of government.  In the three southern New England states, the entire land area is divided into towns and cities, while the three northern states have small areas that are unincorporated. In Vermont and New Hampshire, the population of these areas is practically nonexistent, while in Maine, unincorporated areas make up roughly half of the state’s area but only one percent of the state’s population.

Though the U.S. Census Bureau defines New England towns as "minor civil divisions" for statistical purposes, all New England towns are municipal corporations equivalent to cities in all legal respects, except for form of government.  For statistical purposes, the Census Bureau uses census-designated places for the built-up population centers within towns, though these have no legal or social recognition for residents of those towns.  Similarly, the Census Bureau uses a special designation for urban areas within New England, the New England city and town area, instead of the metropolitan statistical area it uses in the rest of the country.

New Jersey

A town in the context of New Jersey local government refers to one of five types and one of eleven forms of municipal government. While town is often used as a shorthand to refer to a township, the two are not the same. The Town Act of 1895 allowed any municipality or area with a population exceeding 5,000 to become a Town through a petition and referendum process. Under the 1895 Act, a newly incorporated town was divided into at least three wards, with two councilmen per ward serving staggered two-year terms, and one councilman at large, who also served a two-year term. The councilman at large served as chairman of the town council. The Town Act of 1988 completely revised the town form of government and applied to all towns incorporated under the Town Act of 1895 and to those incorporated by a special charter granted by the Legislature prior to 1875.

Under the 1988 Act, the mayor is also the councilman at large, serving a term of two years, unless increased to three years by a petition and referendum process. The council under the Town Act of 1988 consists of eight members serving staggered two-year terms with two elected from each of four wards. One council member from each ward is up for election each year. Towns with different structures predating the 1988 Act may retain those features unless changed by a petition and referendum process. Two new provisions were added in 1991 to the statutes governing towns, First, a petition and referendum process was created whereby the voters can require that the mayor and town council be elected to four-year terms of office. The second new provision defines the election procedure in towns with wards. The mayor in a town chairs the town council and heads the municipal government. The mayor may both vote on legislation before council and veto ordinances. A veto may be overridden by a vote of two-thirds of all the members of the council. The council may enact an ordinance to delegate all or a portion of the executive responsibilities of the town to a municipal administrator. Fifteen New Jersey municipalities currently have a type of town, nine of which operate under the town form of government.

New York

In New York, a town is a division of the county that possesses home rule powers, but generally with fewer functions than towns in New England. A town provides a closer level of governance than its enclosing county, providing almost all municipal services to unincorporated communities, called hamlets, and selected services to incorporated areas, called villages. In New York, a town typically contains a number of such hamlets and villages. However, due to their independent nature, incorporated villages may exist in two towns or even two counties (example: Almond (village), New York). Everyone in New York who does not live in a city or Indian reservation lives in a town and possibly in one of the town's hamlets or villages. New York City and Geneva are the only two cities that span county boundaries. The only part of Geneva in Seneca County is water; each of the boroughs of New York City is a county.

North Carolina
In North Carolina, all cities, towns, and villages are incorporated as municipalities. According to the North Carolina League of Municipalities, there is no legal distinction among a city, town, or village—it is a matter of preference of the local government.  Some North Carolina cities have populations as small as 1,000 residents, while some towns, such as Cary, have populations of greater than 100,000.

Oklahoma
In Oklahoma, according to the state's municipal code, city means a municipality which has incorporated as a city in accordance with the laws of the state, whereas town means a municipality which has incorporated as a town in accordance with the laws of the state, and municipality means any incorporated city or town.  The term village is not defined or used in the act.  Any community of people residing in compact form may become incorporated as a town; however, if the resident population is one thousand or more, a town or community of people residing in compact form may become incorporated as a city.

Pennsylvania
In Pennsylvania, the incorporated divisions are townships, boroughs, and cities, of which boroughs are equivalent to towns (example: State College is a borough). However, one borough is incorporated as a town: Bloomsburg.

Texas
In Texas, although some municipalities refer to themselves as "towns" or "villages" (to market themselves as an attractive place to live), these names have no specific designation in Texas law; legally all incorporated places are considered cities.

Utah

In Utah, the legal use of the terms town and city is based on population. A municipality with a population of 1,000 or more is a city, while less than 1,000 is a town. In addition, cities are divided into five separate classes based on the population.

Virginia

In Virginia, a town is an incorporated municipality similar to a city (though with a smaller required minimum population).  But while cities are by Virginia law independent of counties, towns are contained within counties.

Washington

A town in the state of Washington is a municipality that has a population of less than 1,500 at incorporation, however an existing town can reorganize as a code city. Town government authority is limited relative to cities, the other main classification of municipalities in the state. , most municipalities in Washington are cities. (See List of towns in Washington.)

Wisconsin

Wisconsin has towns which are areas outside of incorporated cities and villages. These towns retain the name of the civil township from which they evolved and are often the same name as a neighboring city. Some towns, especially those in urban areas, have services similar to those of incorporated cities, such as police departments. These towns will, from time to time, incorporate into cities, such as Fox Crossing in 2016 from the former town of Menasha. Often this is to protect against being annexed into neighboring cities and villages.

Wyoming
A Wyoming statute indicates towns are incorporated municipalities with populations of less than 4,000. Municipalities of 4,000 or more residents are considered "first-class cities".

Vietnam 
In Vietnam, a district-level town is the second subdivision, below a province or municipality. A commune-level town a third-level (commune-level) subdivision, below a district.

See also

 Commuter town
 Company town
 Developed environments
 List of towns
 Location (geography)
 Megalopolis (city type)
 Proto-city
 Town charter
 Town Hall
 Town limits
 Town privileges
 Town square

References

Sources

External links

 Australian Bureau of Statistics: Australian Standard Geographical Classification (ASGC) 2005
 Open-Site Regional — Contains information about towns in numerous countries.
 Geopolis : research group, university of Paris-Diderot, France — Access to Geopolis Database

 
 
Types of populated places